Panou is a Canadian actor.

Biography
His birth-name translates to 'God Among Us' in his native Creole. His first feature film was Trial of a Serial Killer in 1997; he has since had roles in such film projects as X-Men Origins: Wolverine, Steal This Movie! (as Bobby Seale), the independent feature Fizzy Bizness, and the feature film The Invisible. Panou has also appeared in television shows including Caprica, I Was A Sixth Grade Alien, Stargate SG-1, and Stargate Atlantis.

Filmography
Love Happens
Caprica
X-Men Origins: Wolverine
Flash Gordon (TV) (2007)
I Was A Sixth Grade Alien
This Means War
Stargate Atlantis

References

External links
Panou's Official Website

Living people
Year of birth missing (living people)
Black Canadian male actors
Canadian male film actors
Haitian emigrants to Canada
Canadian people of Haitian descent
Canadian sketch comedians
Black Canadian comedians